Georgia is set to participate in the Eurovision Song Contest 2023 in Liverpool, United Kingdom. Iru Khechanovi was selected as the Georgian representative through the fifth season of The Voice Georgia, while her competing song "Echo" was internally selected and released on 16 March 2023.

Background 

Prior to the 2023 contest, Georgia has participated in the Eurovision Song Contest fourteen times since their first entry in 2007. The nation briefly withdrew from the contest in  after the European Broadcasting Union (EBU) rejected the Georgian entry, "We Don't Wanna Put In", for perceived political references to Vladimir Putin who was the Russian Prime Minister at the time. The withdrawal and fallout was tied to tense relations between Georgia and then-host country Russia, which stemmed from the 2008 Russo-Georgian War. Georgia has, to this point, failed to qualify to the final on seven occasions.

The Georgian national broadcaster, Georgian Public Broadcaster (GPB), broadcasts the event within Georgia and organises the selection process for the nation's entry. Georgia has selected their entry for the Eurovision Song Contest both through national finals and internal selections in the past. For their  participation, the entry was selected through a national final. In 2018 the artist was internally selected. In 2019, the entry was fully selected through Georgian Idol, and the show was used again to select the singer the following year. In 2022, another internal selection was made, with the band Circus Mircus and their song "Lock Me In" being chosen to represent Georgia. The entry failed to qualify from the second semi-final, placing 18th with 22 points. For their 2023 participation, the Georgian entry was selected via the reality television show The Voice Georgia.

Before Eurovision

The Voice Georgia 

The Georgian representative for the Eurovision Song Contest 2023 was selected through the fifth season of The Voice Georgia, the Georgian version of the reality television singing competition format The Voice. GPB announced the opening of applications in late August 2022, which would close on in late September. The competition commenced on 8 December 2022 and concluded with a final on 2 February 2023. All shows in the competition were hosted by presenter Gvantsa Daraselia. The live shows were broadcast on 1TV and via online streaming on the broadcaster's website. In the final, the 8 remaining artists performed one after the other, with no eliminations, and the winner was selected exclusively via televote. Iru Khechanovi emerged as the winner of the season and the Georgian representative in the Eurovision Song Contest 2023.

Song selection 
Khechanovi's competing song for the contest was internally selected by GPB. Titled "Echo", it was released on 16 March 2023.

At Eurovision 
According to Eurovision rules, all nations with the exceptions of the host country and the "Big Five" (France, Germany, Italy, Spain and the United Kingdom) are required to qualify from one of two semi-finals in order to compete for the final; the top ten countries from each semi-final progress to the final. The European Broadcasting Union (EBU) split up the competing countries into six different pots based on voting patterns from previous contests, with countries with favourable voting histories put into the same pot. On 31 January 2023, an allocation draw was held, which placed each country into one of the two semi-finals, and determined which half of the show they would perform in. Georgia has been placed into the second semi-final, to be held on 11 May 2023, and has been scheduled to perform in the second half of the show.

References 

Countries in the Eurovision Song Contest 2023
Georgia